Poropuntius fuxianhuensis is a species of ray-finned fish in the genus Poropuntius.

References 

fuxianhuensis
Fish described in 1982